Nikolai Sergeyevich Sidorov (born 5 November 1974) is a Russian professional football coach and a former player.

Playing career
He made his debut in the Russian Premier League in 1998 for FC Shinnik Yaroslavl. He played 2 games in the UEFA Intertoto Cup 1998 for FC Shinnik Yaroslavl.

Honours
 Russian Third League Zone 4 top scorer: 1997 (18 goals).

External links
 

1974 births
Sportspeople from Kaluga
Living people
Russian footballers
Association football midfielders
FC Shinnik Yaroslavl players
FC Spartak Tambov players
FC Metallurg Lipetsk players
Russian Premier League players
Russian football managers
FC Lokomotiv Kaluga players
FC Znamya Truda Orekhovo-Zuyevo players